Surrey is an unincorporated community in Jasper County, Indiana, in the United States.

History
Surrey was made a station on the railroad built through that territory in the early 1880s. A post office was established at Surrey in 1882, and remained in operation until it was discontinued in 1926. The community was named after Surrey, in England.

References

Unincorporated communities in Jasper County, Indiana
Unincorporated communities in Indiana